Voyriella is a genus of flowering plants belonging to the family Gentianaceae.

Its native range is Panama to Southern Tropical America.

Species:
 Voyriella parviflora (Miq.) Miq.

References

Gentianaceae
Gentianaceae genera